Neal Powless is an Iroquois lacrosse player from the Onondaga Nation near Syracuse, New York.  He is the son of Chief Irving Powless Jr. and brother to Barry Powless and Bradley Powless.

He was a three-time All-American in field lacrosse at Nazareth College. Powless also played on the Iroquois Nationals at the World Lacrosse Championships in 1994, 1998, 2002 and 2006. He has also played for several professional box lacrosse teams, including the Six Nations Chiefs of the Ontario Lacrosse Association. He played on the Rochester Knighthawks of the Major Indoor Lacrosse League in 1997, when they won their first title.

Powless continues to be involved in the game through coaching box lacrosse teams as well as traveling across the United States doing field lacrosse camps.

Neal Powless has been coaching the Dutch Box Lacrosse program since their first European Championships in 2017. 
At the 2019 World Lacrosse Men's Indoor World Championship. the Dutch placed 8th (ranked 17th coming in).

References

Iroquois nations lacrosse players
Sportspeople from New York (state)
American Mohawk people
Buffalo Bandits players
Living people
Native American sportspeople
Nazareth Golden Flyers men's lacrosse players
Sportspeople from Syracuse, New York
Lacrosse in Syracuse, New York
Year of birth missing (living people)
Onondaga people